"De Do Do Do, De Da Da Da" is a song by the Police, released as a single on 20 November 1980. Released as the British second single from the album Zenyatta Mondatta, the song was written by Sting as a comment on how people love simple-sounding songs. The song was re-recorded in 1986 as "De Do Do Do, De Da Da Da '86" but not released until 1995.

Background
According to lead singer Sting, the song is about the attraction that people have to simple songs. Sting later criticised those who labelled the lyrics of the song as "baby talk," claiming that the song was grossly misunderstood. He evaluated, "The lyrics are about banality, about the abuse of words," saying that "the lyrics have an internal logic."

Sting also said that "I was trying to say something which was really quite difficult – that people like politicians, like myself even, use words to manipulate people, and that you should be very careful.”

The phrase "De Do Do Do, De Da Da Da" supposedly was made up by Sting's son. Sting said of this, "In fact, my son came up with it. I've never paid him – so that's another possible lawsuit. He writes songs himself these days. He's got a lot of self-confidence – I don't know where from."

Its B-side, "A Sermon," was originally written by Stewart Copeland in 1977 and is a parable about a band ruthlessly making it to the top. Copeland played most of the guitar as well, including the intro riff, while Andy Summers can be heard in the middle. Sting said of the song, "It's arrogant, but Stewart is good at being arrogant in a funny way – as in that Klark Kent line about 'If you don't like me, you can suck my socks'." In the US version of the single, "De Do Do Do De Da Da Da" was paired with "Friends", a composition by Andy Summers.

"De Do Do Do, De Da Da Da" was released as the follow-up single to "Don't Stand So Close to Me" in Britain, and was released as the debut single from Zenyatta Mondatta in America. In addition to its English-language release, both a Spanish-language and Japanese-language version of the song were recorded and released in their respective markets in early 1981. Actual 45rpm copies are rare.

Record World said that "Sting's affecting vocals and a percussion-clad rhythm track have created retail/radio reaction that's strictly big business."

The cover was designed by Hipgnosis and uses the title of the song to juxtapose an image of the band with one of a woman's hand reaching out to a telephone to call the police.

The song was prominently featured in the 1982 film The Last American Virgin and on its soundtrack. It also appeared in the pilot episode of the medical drama St. Elsewhere.

Composition
The song is composed in the key of A major with the chord progression of Asus2-F#m7(add4)-C#m7 in the verses and Asus2-A-Asus2-A-E-D in the chorus. The song uses guitar reverb and echo in the verses.

"I've danced in the Caribbean for weeks to that song," remarked Joni Mitchell. "I'm an old rock and roll dancer, you know. The stops, the pauses, in that one are really fun. I appreciated the rhythmic hybrids, the gaps between the bass lines, the repetitive figures with space between them. James Taylor and I had dinner with Sting once at our mutual manager's place. He was quite effusive about us being his heroes. So I always think of him as our son."

Track listing
7-inch – A&M / AMS 9110 (UK)
 "De Do Do Do, De Da Da Da" – 4:09
 "A Sermon" – 2:34

7-inch – A&M / AM 2275 (US)
 "De Do Do Do, De Da Da Da" – 4:09
 "Friends" – 3:35

7-inch – A&M / AM 25000 (US)
 "De Do Do Do, De Da Da Da" (Spanish Version) – 4:00
 "De Do Do Do, De Da Da Da" (Japanese Version) – 4:00

Personnel
Sting – bass, lead and backing vocals
Andy Summers – guitar, lead vocals on "Friends"
Stewart Copeland – drums, guitar on "A Sermon"

Charts

Weekly charts

Year-end charts

"De Do Do Do, De Da Da Da '86"

The song was re-recorded in 1986, alongside "Don't Stand So Close to Me '86," for inclusion on the Every Breath You Take: The Singles compilation but was ultimately excluded from the album. It was released on the DTS-CD and SACD releases of the Every Breath You Take: The Classics album.

References

1980 songs
1980 singles
The Police songs
Songs written by Sting (musician)
Song recordings produced by Nigel Gray
A&M Records singles
Onomatopoeia
Albums with cover art by Hipgnosis